The caves of the Serro da Ramalho karst area in the municipality of Serra do Ramalho, a municipality of the same name in southwestern Bahia State, Brazil, have been explored since the early 2000s. The several large cave systems present a great biospeleological potential. Newly discovered species include the first troglobitic Amblypygi recorded for Brazil, Charinus troglobius Baptista & Giupponi, 2003, an eyeless harvestman (Giupponia chagasi  Pérez & Kury, 2002), an as yet undescribed genus of spiders (Ochyroceratidae), and a species of catfish (Rhamdia enfurnada Bichuette & Trajano, 2005).

Footnotes

References
  (2005): A new cave species of Rhamdia (Siluriformes: Heptapteridae) from Serra do Ramalho, northeastern Brazil, with notes on ecology and behavior. Neotropical Ichthyology 3(4): 587–595. PDF
  (2003): A new troglomorphic Charinus from Minas Gerais State, Brazil (Arachnida: Amblypygi: Charinidae). Revista Ibérica de Aracnología 7: 79–84.

Further reading
 XXVII Congresso Brasileiro de Espeleologia (2003): O potencial espeleológico da Serra do Ramalho. Sociedade Brasileira de Espeleologia. Abstract (in Portuguese)

Caves of Bahia
Karst caves